Fire! is a 1977 American made-for-television action-drama disaster film produced by Irwin Allen starring Ernest Borgnine, Vera Miles, Patty Duke Astin, Alex Cord, Donna Mills, Lloyd Nolan, Neville Brand, Ty Hardin and Erik Estrada. It was directed by Earl Bellamy, who directed another made-for-TV disaster film one year before titled Flood!.

Plot
Convict Larry Durant escapes from an Oregon road gang, and starts a fire in a forest, which goes out of control and threatens to destroy a small mountain community. Involved are a lumber mill owner, Sam Brisbane; Martha Wagner, the widowed operator of a forest lodge; teacher, Harriet Malone, who is on a class outing; a country doctor, Doc Bennett, and a young couple, Doctors Alex and Peggy Wilson, whose shaky marriage is healed when battling the blaze brings out their better natures.

Cast
 Ernest Borgnine as Sam Brisbane
 Vera Miles as Martha Wagner
 Patty Duke Astin as Dr. Peggy Wilson
 Alex Cord as Dr. Alex Wilson
 Donna Mills as Harriett Malone
 Lloyd Nolan as Doc Bennett
 Neville Brand as Larry Durant
 Ty Hardin as Walt Fleming
 Gene Evans as Dan Harter
 Erik Estrada as Frank
 Michelle Stacy as Judy

Production
The film was directed in the cities of Silverton and Yamhill, in Oregon.

Release
Fire! premiered on May 8, 1977 on NBC on two-hours length; it was later cut to ninety minutes and rerun in tandem with another TV disaster movie, Flood!, also produced by Irwin Allen.

The New York Times called it "mindless escapism."

Titles around the world
Det flammande helvevet (Sweden)
El bosque en llamas (Spain) 
Horizons en flammes (France)
Il colosso di fuoco (Italy)
Horizont in Flammen (West Germany)
Krwawe pieklo (Poland)
Ti nyhta pou oi ouranoi epiasan fotia (Greece)
Tuhoavat liekit (Finland)

References

External links

1977 television films
1977 films
1970s disaster films
1970s action drama films
American disaster films
American action drama films
Disaster television films
NBC network original films
Films shot in Oregon
Films about arson
Films about firefighting
Films scored by Richard LaSalle
Films set in Oregon
Films produced by Irwin Allen
Films directed by Earl Bellamy
Films about wildfires
American drama television films
1970s English-language films
1970s American films